Mount Carmel High School is a public high school in Mt. Carmel, Illinois. It is the only high school in Wabash County, Illinois, which is in southern Illinois, just across the Wabash River from Gibson County, Indiana.  Other towns that send students to MCHS include Allendale, Patton, Keensburg, and Friendsville.  Enrollment is also possible for residents of Cowling, although their students are usually sent to the nearby school in Grayville.

Athletics

Teams
Mt. Carmel's athletic teams are nicknamed the Golden Aces and the school's colors are maroon and gold. The school received the nickname during the 1915-1916 basketball season. Before then, the school's athletic teams were called the Maroon & Gold. The boys' basketball team participated in a tournament in the Wood River area and won the tournament championship. A sportswriter for the area said that the team played like "Five Golden Aces." The players and students like it and teams have competed as the Golden Aces ever since.

The Aces have been competing independently since 2019 when a new format in IHSA playoffs meant that Mount Carmel had to withdraw from the Big Eight Conference which has since folded. Mount Carmel competes in the following sports as an independent school:

Boys Basketball
Girls Basketball
Football
Softball
Baseball
Volleyball
Wrestling
Boys Tract
Girls Track
Cross Country
Boys Golf
Girls Golf
Boys Tennis
Girls Tennis
Boys Soccer
Girls Soccer

State championships
Basketball
1927 State Champions
Football
1981 3A State Champions
Boys Golf
2010 1A State Champions
Girls Golf
2021 1A State Champions https://www.tristatehomepage.com/sports/mt-carmel-girls-golf-team-honored-after-winning-state-championship/
2022 1A State Champions

See also
Wabash Valley College

References

External links
Statistics from the Illinois Interactive Report Card, hosted at Northern Illinois University
Illinois K12 District 348
Mount Carmel High School

Public high schools in Illinois
Mount Carmel, Illinois
Schools in Wabash County, Illinois